Triturus macedonicus, the Macedonian crested newt, is a newt species of the crested newt species complex in genus Triturus, found in the Western Balkan peninsula (Bosnia-Herzegovina, Albania, North Macedonia, north-western Greece and south-western Bulgaria).

To the North, its range borders that of the Danube crested newt and the Northern crested newt and to the East, that of the Balkan-Anatolian crested newt.

It was first described as a variety of Triturus karelinii, later considered a subspecies of Triturus carnifex, and was elevated to species rank following molecular phylogenetic analysis in 2007.

Triturus arntzeni was considered a synonym of T. macedonicus, but this name applies in fact to a hybrid between this species and the Balkan-Anatolian crested newt (T. ivanbureschi), and thus is a synonym of both species.

References 

macedonicus
Amphibians of Europe
Amphibians described in 1922
Taxobox binomials not recognized by IUCN <--- Triturus macedonicus --->